Round Point is a point  west of False Round Point on the north coast of King George Island, in the South Shetland Islands of Antarctica. Kellick Island lies 2 km to the north-east and Tartar Island 1 km to the north-west.  The descriptive name dates back to at least 1822 and is established in international usage.

References

Headlands of King George Island (South Shetland Islands)